The Love Charm  is a 1921 American silent comedy film directed by Thomas N. Heffron, starring Wanda Hawley, Mae Busch, and Sylvia Ashton.

Cast
Wanda Hawley as Ruth Sheldon
Mae Busch as Hattie Nast
Sylvia Ashton as Julia Nast
Warner Baxter as Thomas Morgan
Carrie Clark Ward as Housekeeper
Molly McGowan as Maybelle Mooney
Richard Rosson		
Michael D. Moore as the little boy

References

External links

1921 films
Silent American comedy films
1921 comedy films
American silent feature films
American black-and-white films
Films directed by Thomas N. Heffron
1920s American films